Out West (Live at the Fillmore) is a live double album released by Gomez in June 2005 and the first album the band released for ATO Records.  It features material mostly from their first two albums, Bring It On and Liquid Skin, with a few tracks each from In Our Gun and Split the Difference, and one from the Machismo E.P.. There are also a few cover songs, such as "Going Out West" by Tom Waits and "Black Eyed Dog" by Nick Drake (which is combined with "Free to Run" in an extended song).

The front album cover is a psychedelic manipulation of a photograph of a traditional Mexican band, possibly inspired by the Fillmore's tradition of using psychedelic posters to promote events. The back album cover shows a photo of the actual band Gomez using similar coloration to the front.


Track listing
All songs written by Gomez except where indicated.

Disc one
"Get Miles"
"Shot Shot"
"Hangover"
"Going Out West" (Tom Waits)
"Here Comes the Breeze"
"We Haven't Turned Around"
"Fill My Cup"
"Do One" (Dajon Everett, Gomez)
"Revolutionary Kind"

Disc two
"Bring It On"
"Nothing Is Wrong"
"Love Is Better Than a Warm Trombone"
"Do's and Don'ts"
"Black Eyed Dog" (Nick Drake) / "Free to Run"
"Ping One Down"
"Blue Moon Rising"
"Get Myself Arrested"
"These 3 Sins"
"Make No Sound"
"Whippin' Piccadilly"

DVD
The UK edition of the album, released on Independiente, comes with a bonus DVD.
Intro 
"Get Miles"
"Whippin' Piccadilly"
"Black Eyed Dog"
"78 Stone Wobble" / "Fade Away" (Charles Hardin)
Outro & Credits

Personnel
Gomez
Ian Ball
Ben Ottewell
Olly Peacock
Paul Blackburn
Tom Gray
with:
Dajon Everett - keyboards, percussion, electronics
Technical
Bill Walker, Frank Rinaldi - recording

External links
 

Gomez (band) albums
2005 live albums
Independiente Records live albums
Albums recorded at the Fillmore
ATO Records live albums
Sony BMG live albums